These are the official results of the Men's long jump event at the 1982 European Championships in Athens, Greece, held at Olympic Stadium "Spiros Louis" on 8 and 9 September 1982.

Medalists

Results

Final
9 September

Qualification
8 September

Participation
According to an unofficial count, 22 athletes from 15 countries participated in the event.

 (1)
 (3)
 (2)
 (1)
 (1)
 (1)
 (2)
 (1)
 (1)
 (3)
 (1)
 (1)
 (2)
 (1)
 (1)

See also
 1978 Men's European Championships Long Jump (Prague)
 1980 Men's Olympic Long Jump (Moscow)
 1983 Men's World Championships Long Jump (Helsinki)
 1984 Men's Olympic Long Jump (Los Angeles)
 1986 Men's European Championships Long Jump (Stuttgart)
 1987 Men's World Championships Long Jump (Rome)
 1988 Men's Olympic Long Jump (Seoul)

References

 Results

Long jump
Long jump at the European Athletics Championships